Alberto Ammann Rey (born 1978) is an Argentine actor. He has played various roles in films, television and theater, including the lead role in the Spanish film Cell 211, which earned him a Goya Award for Best New Actor. He is also known for playing Pacho Herrera in Narcos and Narcos: Mexico.

Biography
Ammann was born in Córdoba, Argentina, son of journalist, politician, and writer Luis Alberto Ammann and his wife Nélida Rey. In 1978, at the age of one month, he moved with his parents to Spain [Madrid and the Canary Islands), escaping from the last military dictatorship of Argentina, returning to the country in 1982. Years later, he returned to Spain to complete his studies.

He studied acting in the school of Juan Carlos Corazza, as well as the Theater Seminary Jolie Libois, located in Cordoba. Ruben Andalor, Willy Lanni and Ricky Ceballos were among his teachers.

Acting career
In the 2009 Spanish film Cell 211, Ammann played Juan Oliver, a prison guard who gets mistaken for an inmate when the prison gets taken over by an inmate named Malamadre (Luis Tosar). He prepared for the role by talking to officers and prisoners. On 14 February 2010, at the XXIV Goya Awards, he won Best New Actor for this role.

In 2010, Ammann starred in Lope in the leading role as the Spanish playwright and poet Lope de Vega.

Ammann starred in a Chanel commercial alongside Keira Knightley that aired in Hispanic countries starting on 4 April 2011.

In 2015, Ammann starred as gay Cali Cartel member Hélmer Herrera in the Netflix series, Narcos.

In 2016, Ammann starred as Javier Delgado, hydrologist and geochemist, in National Geographic's mini-series Mars.

2017 saw the release of television series Apaches on Netflix; an adaptation of Miguel Saez Carral's book of the same title. Ammann stars as protagonist Miguel, a young and promising journalist.

Filmography

Film
2009: Cell 211 (by Daniel Monzón) - Juan Oliver
2010: Lope (by Andrucha Waddington) - Lope (Félix Lope de Vega y Carpio)
2011: Eva (by Kike Maillo) - David Garel
2012: Invasor (by Daniel Calparsoro) - Pablo
2013: Tesis sobre un homicidio (by Hernán Goldfrid) - Gonzalo Ruiz Cordera
2013: Combustion - Navas
2013: Mindscape - Tom Ortega
2014: Betibú - Mariano Saravia
2015: The Debt - Ricardo
2017: Lazaro: An Improvised Film - Tino
2019: El silencio del cazador - Orlando Venneck
2020: El año de la furia - Diego
2022: Upon Entry
2022:  Overdose
TBA: Presences

Television
2008: Plan América (Plan) - Capitán Mateo
2010: No soy como tú (I'm not like you) - Alberto
2010: La princesa de Éboli (The Princess of Éboli)
2015-2017: Narcos  - Pacho Herrera
2017: Apaches - Miguel
2016-2018: Mars - Javier Delgado
2018-2021: Narcos: Mexico - Pacho Herrera
2022: The Longest Night - Hugo Roca

Theater
Las brujas de Salem (The Crucible) (directed by Ricardo Ceballos)
Paria (directed by Guillermo Ianni)

References

External links
 
 Page on cinenacional.com
 Page on Kurandaweb.com

1978 births
Living people
Argentine emigrants to Spain
Male actors from Córdoba, Argentina
Argentine male television actors
Goya Award winners